Matt King (born 31 January 1968) is an English actor, DJ and comedian currently residing in Brighton. He is best known for his role as Super Hans in the British sitcom Peep Show.

Early life
King was born in Watford, Hertfordshire, England on 31 January 1968. He moved to Australia where he worked as a chef before meeting Jimeoin McKeown. McKeown suggested that King become a stand-up comedian. King worked in the Australian comedy circuit for 15 years before returning to the UK.

Career
As an actor he has played many characters, including Elton John and Terry Venables in the BAFTA-nominated comedy series Star Stories, and also starring in his own self-penned sketch show Dogface, both available on Channel 4.

His role as Super Hans in Peep Show spanned more than a decade. He has performed DJ sets in-character as Super Hans.

He has appeared in cult comedy series Look Around You and in the third series of Skins, playing Cook's father, a character very similar to Super Hans. He co-starred in the film Inkheart, appeared in the Guy Ritchie film Rocknrolla and the British film Bronson, and had a lead role in the fantasy thriller Malice in Wonderland. He also appeared in the third series of Doctor Who as Peter Streete in "The Shakespeare Code", and was a regular character in the BBC production Jekyll playing computer expert Freeman. He played a ticket tout in the acclaimed independent short film "Brussels" by Misha Manson-Smith.

As a stand-up comedian he has appeared at the Edinburgh Festival and at the Melbourne International Comedy Festival.

King played a mad scientist in a 2007 commercial promoting a newly customizable credit card by Capital One.

In 2010 he played driver and bodyguard to Ray Winstone's character Rob Gant in London Boulevard alongside Colin Farrell and Keira Knightley. In the same year he co-wrote the BBC2 series Whites starring Alan Davies.

In 2011, King starred in the Australian drama series Spirited, in which he plays the ghost of 1980s rock star Henry Mallet. He also stars in the Sky One generational family comedy drama, Starlings, co-written with Steve Edge and produced by Steve Coogan.

In 2013 King appeared in the final episode of The IT Crowd as Raymond Peterfellow.

In 2015 he narrated the audiobook The Hunt for the Mayor of Smoochyville, written by writer and musician Chris Wade.

In 2017 he appeared as Phil Hendricks in the BBC drama In the Dark.

In 2018 he appeared as a policeman in the Netflix series The End of the F***ing World.

In 2019 he appeared in the music video of the Sam Fender single  "Saturday".

In 2021 he appeared as the father who comically abandons his family in a Zen auto commercial.

Personal life
He is a fan of Tottenham Hotspur as is his character on Peep Show.

Filmography

Film

Television

Video games

References

External links
 
 

1968 births
English male comedians
English male film actors
English male television actors
English male video game actors
English male voice actors
English television writers
Living people
Male actors from Hertfordshire
People educated at Cheshunt School
People from Watford
20th-century English comedians
20th-century English male actors
21st-century English comedians
21st-century English male actors
British male television writers